"I've Returned" is a single in the Netherlands, released from Squeeze's fifth album, Sweets from a Stranger.

Background
Glenn Tillbrook said of the song, "It's slightly grandiose-sounding, which is not my cup of tea really. On the whole it's not a bad version. It's a bit like Bruce Springsteen's 'Born to Run'. And yet another song about drinking." Chris Difford said, I've Returned' could have been on East Side Story. It's a lyric that reflects our early writing, so I suppose we were beginning to repeat ourselves. We were cocooned in a web of touring and it was suffocating our skills. We didn't have any time to observe".

The song also was a popular live number at the time. Tillbrook said, "We used to do this as the first number in the set, to replace 'In Quintessence'."

Cash Box praised its " sheer playfulness," calling it a "quick 'n clever slab of wry pop/rock."

Track listing
 "I've Returned" (2:36)
 "When the Hangover Strikes" (4:31)

External links
Squeeze discography at Squeezenet

References

Squeeze (band) songs
1982 singles
Songs written by Glenn Tilbrook
Songs written by Chris Difford
1982 songs
A&M Records singles